Michel Kaplan (born 15 April 1946) is a French medieval historian, docteur d'État, professor emeritus and former president of Pantheon-Sorbonne University. He is a Byzantinist specialising in history of mentalities, rural space and hagiography of the Eastern Roman Empire.

Career 
In his early years, Kaplan followed the courses taught by Paul Lemerle. He began his career as an assistant professor and then lecturer at the Pantheon-Sorbonne University (Paris I), where he defended his thèse d'état (doctoral dissertation)  in 1987. He then became a professor of medieval history at Paris I since 1988 and had been president of this university from 1999 to 2004. Since 2003, his research had encompassed the history of Byzantine mentalities. He retired from his job in 2015. On 13 November 2018, a lecture given by Kaplan took place at the Athens Concert Hall in Greece.

Publications 
 Les Propriétés de la Couronne et de l'Église dans l'Empire byzantin, Ve-VIe siècles : documents, Paris, Publications de la Sorbonne, 1976.
 Le Proche-Orient médiéval : des Barbares aux Ottomans, Paris, Hachette, 1978, nouv. éd. 1988, 1990, 1997, 2003 et 2006 (avec Alain Ducellier et Bernadette Martin).
 Tout l'or de Byzance, collection « Découvertes Gallimard » (nº 104), série Histoire. Paris: Éditions Gallimard, 1991.
 Les hommes et la terre à Byzance du VIe au XIe siècle : propriété et exploitation du sol, Publications de la Sorbonne, 1992.
 Les Saints et leur sanctuaire à Byzance : textes, images et monument, Paris, Publications de la Sorbonne, 1993 (avec Catherine Jolivet-Lévy et Jean-Pierre Sodini).
 La Chrétienté orientale, du début du VIIe siècle au milieu du XIe siècle. Textes et documents, Paris, SEDES, 1996 (avec Marie-France Auzépy et Bernadette Martin-Hisard).
 La Chrétienté byzantine, du début du VIIe siècle au milieu du XIe siècle : images et reliques, moines et moniales, Constantinople et Rome, Paris, SEDES, 1997.
 Le Moyen Âge, Paris, Bréal, 2000 (tome I : IVe-Xe siècles, tome II : XIe-XVe siècles) (dir. Michel Kaplan, auteurs : Michel Zimmermann, Christophe Picard).
 Le Sacré et son inscription dans l'espace à Byzance et en Occident : études comparée, Paris, Publications de la Sorbonne, 2001 (direction).
 Monastères, images, pouvoirs et société à Byzance, Paris, Publications de la Sorbonne, 2006 (codirection avec Paule Pagès).
 Byzance : villes et campagnes, Paris, Picard, 2006 (recueil d'articles).
 With A. Ducellier, Byzance : IVe-XVe siècle, Paris, Hachette, 2006.
 Byzance, Paris, Les Belles lettres, 2007.
 Pouvoirs, Église et sainteté : essais sur la société byzantine, Paris, Publications de la Sorbonne, 2011 (recueil d'articles).
 Le Moyen Âge en Orient : Byzance et l'islam (avec A. Ducellier, B. Martin, F. Micheau), Paris, Hachette, 2012.
 Pourquoi Byzance ? : Un empire de onze siècles,  Paris, Gallimard, 2016.

References 

1946 births
Living people
French Byzantinists
20th-century French historians
21st-century French historians